Big Sandy Community and Technical College (BSCTC) is a public community college with its headquarters in Prestonsburg, Kentucky. It is part of the Kentucky Community and Technical College System. It was created in 2003 from the consolidation of Prestonsburg Community College and Mayo Technical College. BSCTC maintains four campus locations: Prestonsburg Campus (formerly Prestonsburg Community College) in Prestonsburg; Mayo Campus (formerly Mayo Technical College) in Paintsville; Pikeville Campus in Pikeville; and Hager Hill Campus in Hager Hill. Big Sandy Community and Technical College is accredited by the Southern Association of Colleges and Schools (SACS).

Service area
The primary service area of BSCTC includes the following counties:

Floyd
Johnson
Magoffin
Martin
Pike

See also

East Kentucky Science Center

Notes and references

External links
Official website

Education in Floyd County, Kentucky
Education in Johnson County, Kentucky
Education in Pike County, Kentucky
Buildings and structures in Floyd County, Kentucky
Buildings and structures in Johnson County, Kentucky
Buildings and structures in Pike County, Kentucky
Kentucky Community and Technical College System
Educational institutions established in 2003
Universities and colleges accredited by the Southern Association of Colleges and Schools
2003 establishments in Kentucky
Universities and colleges formed by merger in the United States
Prestonsburg, Kentucky